Aplagiognathus spinosus is a species of longhorn beetle. It is endemic to Honduras and the Mexican states of Puebla, Oaxaca and Veracruz.

References 

Beetles described in 1840
Prioninae